The Fruitland Formation is a geologic formation found in the San Juan Basin in the states of New Mexico and Colorado, in the United States of America. It contains fossils dating it to the Campanian age of the late Cretaceous.

The Fruitland Formation shares its name with Fruitland, New Mexico. That city is on what was the western shore of the Western Interior Seaway.

Description 
The Fruitland Formation is a sedimentary geological formation containing layers of sandstone, shale, and coal. It was laid down in marshy delta conditions, with poor drainage and frequent flooding, under a warm, humid and seasonal climate.

The Fruitland is underlain by the Pictured Cliffs Sandstone, and overlain by the more recent Kirtland Formation.  The sequence of rocks represents the final filling of the Cretaceous seaway.  The underlying Pictured Cliffs is a marginal marine sandstone, deposited in an environment similar to offshore barrier islands of the southeast United States.  As the seaway retreated, the Pictured Cliffs was covered by the Fruitland Formation, which was deposited in near-shore swampy lowlands. The formation is dated to the late Campanian (part of the Cretaceous period), and was deposited over a period of about a million years. Radiometric dating from 23 meters above the base of the formation has yielded an age of 76.03 ± 0.41 Ma ago. An ash bed lying above the upper boundary with the Kirtland Formation has been dated to 75.02 ± 0.13 Ma ago. The underlying Pictured Cliffs Sandstone would be dated 76.94 - 76.27 Ma, based on the presence of the ammonite Baculites scotti, therefore placing the base of the Fruitland Formation at ~76.3 Ma. 

The formation is subdivided into the upper Fossil Forrest Member (deposited between about 75.5-75 million years ago) and the lower Ne-nah-ne-zad Member (deposited from 76.3-75.5 million years ago). The Fossil Forrest member is considered to be part of the Hunter Wash, fauna shared with the overlying lower Kirtland Formation.

Paleofauna

Ornithischians

Saurischians 
Some remains (OMNH 10131) of Bistahieversor may actually have originated in the upper Fruitland Formation.

Economic geology 

The Fruitland Formation contains beds of bituminous coal that are mined in places along the outcrop. Original reserves of coal in the formation have been estimated at 200 billion tons.

Since the 1980s, the coal beds of the Fruitland Formation have yielded large quantities of coalbed methane.  The productive area for coalbed methane straddles the Colorado-New Mexico state line, and is one of the most productive areas for coalbed methane in the United States. The methane released from the Fruitland Formation, through oil and gas production and a bit of natural seepage, contributes to the Four Corners Methane Hot Spot.

See also 
 List of stratigraphic units with dinosaur body fossils
 List of fossiliferous stratigraphic units in Colorado
 List of fossiliferous stratigraphic units in New Mexico

References 

Geologic formations of Colorado
Upper Cretaceous Series of North America
Cretaceous Colorado
Cretaceous formations of New Mexico
Campanian Stage
Sandstone formations of the United States
Shale formations of the United States
Coal formations
Deltaic deposits
Ichnofossiliferous formations
Ooliferous formations
Reservoir rock formations
Source rock formations
Unconventional gas
Fossiliferous stratigraphic units of North America
Paleontology in Colorado
Paleontology in New Mexico